The governor of Perm Krai is the highest official of Perm Krai, a federal subject of Russia. The governor heads the executive branch in the region.

History of office 
On 7 December 2003, a referendum was held, at which the residents of Perm Oblast and Komi-Permyak Autonomous Okrug supported the unification of these two regions. The united Perm Krai was established on 1 December 2005. On the same day acting governor of Perm Oblast Oleg Chirkunov took office as governor of Perm Krai.

List of officeholders

Komi-Permyak Autonomous Okrug 
In 1992, Komi-Permyak Autonomous Okrug was proclaimed separate subject of the federation, at the same time continuing to be part of Perm Oblast, being in contractual relations with it. For 14 years of Komi-Permyakia's semi-independent existence two persons were holding the office of Head of Administration.

After 2005 unification, the former autonomy was continued by Komi-Permyak Okrug, a special territory within Perm Krai. Its head is ranked as Minister for Komi-Permyak Okrug Affairs and is appointed by the governor.

References 

Politics of Perm Krai
 
Perm